Johnny Diesel & the Injectors is the eponymous debut album by Australian rock band Johnny Diesel & the Injectors, which was released in 1989. The album peaked at number 2 on the ARIA singles chart and won two ARIA Music Awards.

Background 

Johnny Diesel & the Injectors were formed in Perth in 1986 by Mark Lizotte  Johnny Diesel on lead guitar and lead vocals, Bernie Bremond on saxophone and vocals, John "Tatt" Dalzell on bass guitar, George Dalstrom on guitar and John "Yak" Sherritt on drums. Without Dalstrom the group relocated to Sydney in September 1987. They supported Jimmy Barnes on his Freight Train Heart Tour during November. By mid-1988 they were signed to Chrysalis Records. The four-piece group recorded their debut album, Johnny Diesel & the Injectors, from August to September in Memphis, Tennessee with Terry Manning producing.

Track listing
all tracks written by Mark Lizotte except where noted.

Chart performance

Weekly charts

Year-end charts

Certifications

Awards

Singles

 "Don't Need Love" (1988) (AUS: No. 10)
 "Soul Revival" (1989) (AUS: No. 9)
 "Cry in Shame" (1989) (AUS: No. 10)
 "Lookin' for Love" (1989) (AUS: No. 28)
 "Since I Fell for You" (1989) (AUS: No. 79)

Personnel

 Produced, recorded, engineered and mixed by Terry Manning
 Mastered by: Bob Ludwig at Masterdisk. 
 Tracks arranged by: Terry Manning, Brent Eccles and JD & Injectors. 
 Photography: Brian Hagiwara, David Heffernan. 
 Art Direction: Peter Corriston. 
 Thanks: Among others thanks to Chris Collie, Jamie Manifis, George Dahlstrom, Jim & Jane Barnes, Brian Lizotte. 
 Musicians: Johnny Diesel (vocals, guitar); Bernie Bremond (saxes, backing vocals); Yak Sherrit (drums); Johnny 'Tatt' Dalzell (bass) and the 'F A Horns' (Johnny Diesel, Bernie Bremond & Terry Manning)

VHS

"Johnny Diesel & the Injectors" is a VHS released by Chrysalis Records, Festival Video in 1989, featuring 4 video clips from Johnny Diesel and the Injectors.

Track listing

 Lookin' for Love	
 Soul Revival	
 Cry in Shame	
 Don't Need Love	
 Thang I

External links

References

1989 debut albums
ARIA Award-winning albums
Diesel (musician) albums
Albums produced by Terry Manning
Music video compilation albums
1989 video albums